Eucosma obumbratana is a moth of the family Tortricidae. It is found in Europe, China (Jilin), Russia and Kazakhstan.

The wingspan is 14–20 mm.The forewings are yellow-brown, usually lighter in the posterior part. At the outer edge there are a couple of short black longitudinal lines and at the tip a small, triangular white spot. The hindwings are grey-brown. Adults are on wing from July to August. There is one generation per year.

The larvae feed on the seedheads of Sonchus arvensis, Picris hieracioides and Centaurea jacea.

References

External links
 Lepidoptera of Belgium
 Eucosma obumbratana at UKMoths

Eucosmini
Moths described in 1846
Moths of Japan
Moths of Europe